Kecia Danielle Morway (born August 25, 1991) is an American retired professional soccer player who played as a defender. She played for National Women's Soccer League club Chicago Red Stars during 2014 season.

Playing career

Chicago Red Stars (NWSL)

In March 2014, Morway joined Chicago Red Stars in the National Women's Soccer League for their preseason, reaching out to Red Stars head coach and childhood club Eclipse Select SC President Rory Dames. She made 12 appearances in her rookie season, predominantly as a left back.

Retirement
In February 2015, Morway announced her retirement from professional soccer, while already working as an educator.

References

External links
 Colorado College profile

American women's soccer players
1991 births
Living people
Soccer players from Illinois
Chicago Red Stars players
Notre Dame Fighting Irish women's soccer players
Women's association football defenders
National Women's Soccer League players
Colorado College Tigers women's soccer players
People from Lake Villa, Illinois
Women's Premier Soccer League players
Women's Premier Soccer League Elite players